Vos is a Danish girl group from Als Island, founded in the 1980s. The members are Ilse Dahl, Kathrine Schmidt, Hanne Schmidt and Bente Nissen.

Singles
"E Spritte"

References

Danish musical groups